Lina Schwarz (20 March 1876 – 24 November 1947) was an Italian writer, educator, and pacifist. Born into a Jewish family living in Verona, she spent most of her life in Milan. As a result of participating in the women's rights movement in Italy, she became involved in helping disadvantaged children through civic works projects. Teaching children to read led to her becoming a well-known children's book author and a contributor to children's newspapers. She collaborated with musicians to set poems to music, recognizing the potential to increase learning through song. Many of the nursery rhymes known and recited by Italians were written by Schwarz. Although her poem "" ("Star, Little Star, The Night Approaches") is widely known in Italy, her authorship of it was lost after World War II ended. 

Schwarz was a committed pacifist and participated in the 1921 Women's International League for Peace and Freedom Congress of Vienna. She was also one of the developers of anthroposophy in Italy, was one of the first Italian translators of Rudolf Steiner's work, and founded the first Steiner school in Italy. Through her work with women's groups, she introduced anthroposophy to girls' lyceums. Because of anti-Semitic policies adopted by the fascist government of Italy, her ability to publish and disseminate information about anthroposophy declined from 1933. In 1941, she moved from Milan to a farm in Arcisate which used the biodynamic agricultural methods advocated by Steiner. From 1943 to 1945, she fled to Switzerland. Returning to the farm, now operated by the Anthroposophical Society, she died in 1947. In 1963, the school in Arcisate was named in her honor. Her books have been republished in numerous editions and many of her poems are still performed by musicians.

Early life and education
Lina Schwarz was born on 20 March 1876 in Verona in the Kingdom of Italy to Fanny (née Jung) and Edmondo Schwarz. Her father was born in Nagykanizsa, Austria-Hungary, an area known for raising livestock and leather goods. His family were Jewish merchants and after his marriage to Fanny, Edmondo opened a leather shop. Fanny was born into a landowning family from Milan. Lina was one of four childrentwo boys, Gustavo and Ugo, and another girl, Lucia. Around 1890, her family relocated to Milan and settled in the fashionable area surrounding Via della Spiga. She completed her education studying with private tutors.

Activism
The  was founded in 1899 and was Italy's most important women's organization at the time. Its goals were to expand the rights of women and to serve as a networking organization to allow women across varying religions and social classes to collaborate collectively. The  was a community service organization designed to provide guidance in physical, moral and intellectual development. Schwarz worked with girls in the organization, teaching reading and recreational activities. She volunteered there with her friend Laura Orvieto, a fellow writer. At the time, works for children were often written with the intent to educate children and frequently gave harsh lessons. Schwarz's work instead, focused on happiness and mischief, set out to inspire development of their sense of curiosity and comradery. Along with Rosa Genoni, Luisa Magnani, Vittorina Medugno, and Virginia Tango Piatti, she was one of the five Italian delegates who registered to attend the 1921 Women's International League for Peace and Freedom Congress in Vienna.

From 1913, Schwarz followed the teachings of Rudolf Steiner, founder of the spiritual movement known as anthroposophy. That year, she began translating his works and together with Charlotte Ferreri founded a branch of the Steiner study group in Milan to spread his philosophy and educational methods. In 1923, she was the Italian delegate to the conference in Dornach, Switzerland, at which the General Anthroposophical Society was officially founded. Throughout the 1920s her writings were influenced by Steiner's philosophy, which aimed to recover ancient knowledge of the occult and nature in an effort to restore a society which had been degraded by modernization. Steiner's intent was to reintroduce spiritual and intuitive knowledge to scientific rational and empirical methods and thereby change the systems that organized society. He proposed that education, diet, farming, and spirituality should be based on holistic and organic models. She was elected president of the Milanese branch of the Italian Anthroposophical Society in 1933 and served until 1941, when the organization was banned by the fascist government.

The relationship between the Italian Anthroposophical Society and fascism was complex. Initially the fascist regime embraced some of its tenets. However, closer ties between Nazi Germany and fascist Italy dampened the support for Steiner's philosophy and the activities of members began to come under suspicion and scrutiny. The official adoption of anti-Semitic policies called into question anthroposopy's belief that race was related to spirituality rather than biology. That year, Schwarz moved in with her family living in Arcisate, on a farm known as La Monda. The farm was run following biodynamic agricultural methods advocated by Steiner. The increasing severity of the Italian racial laws, led her to flee to Brissago, Switzerland, in the latter half of 1943, to escape the threat of being sent to a concentration camp. When the war ended in 1945, she moved back to Arcisate.

Works
Thanks to its rapid success, she was able to contribute to several of the major children's journals of the times, including Il giornalino della Domenica (The Sunday Newspaper) and Corriere dei Piccoli (The Little Ones' Courier). In 1910,  (Again! ... (Again ... And That's Enough) contained her most known nursery rhyme, "" ("Star, Little Star, The Night Approaches"). Maria Montessori, as early as 1917 was using samples of Schwarz's poetry in her publications about the Montessori method.

Schwarz was the first Italian translator of Steiner's works. Among her translations related to him and his philosophy are "" ("From the Chronicle of the Akasha", 1913), "" ("The Essential Points of the Social Question", 1920), and "" ("Rudolf Steiner: The School, Miscellaneous Writings", 1922). Among other works in the 1920s and 1930s, she published "" ("The Beautiful Spring and First Sun", 1928), "" ("Between Evening and Morning", 1933), and "" ("Lullabies and Little Songs", 1935).

Many of Schwartz's works have been adapted for musical presentation. In 1935, composer Nino Rota chose four poems from Schwarz's first book"" ("The Shepherd Boy"), "" ("The Fisherman"), "" ("It Is Useless"), and "" ("Coming Home")for songs to represent the relationship between children and nature and children and their mother.

Legacy
Schwarz died on 24 November 1947 in Arcisate and was buried in the local cemetery. "" is widely known throughout Italy, but by the end of the war her authorship of it was not remembered by the public. It has become so iconic that journalist Giulia Borgese, queried in an article about the poem carried in Corriere della Sera whether any Italian between the age of three and one hundred wasn't able to recite it. Historian and professor at the Università Cattolica del Sacro Cuore, Sabrina Fava, stated of Schwarz' work, "" ("She has written almost all the poems that have been recited by [Italian] children for decades"). Despite her renown, no complete biography of Schwarz had been written by the second decade of the twenty-first century. Historian Peter Staudenmaier stated that she and Maria Gentilli Kassapian of Trieste were the most important anthroposophists of Italy, Fava credits her as the most significant Italian translator of Steiner's work. The farm she had in Arcisate is now owned by the Anthroposophical Society. The elementary school in the village was renamed in her honor in 1963. 

Many of her works have been reprinted multiple times and used in textbooks for children. In 1974, Irene Cattaneo, an editor for the journal  (The Echo, of Jewish Education), published an anthology,  (The Ways of Time) which included works by Schwarz and Orvieto, among other Jewish-Italian writers. From the mid-1950s to mid-1970s,  (Three Poems'') which included "" ("At the Moon"), "" ("The Little Baker"), and "" ("Piero the Malcontent") set to music by Giulio Cesare Brero were performed often on the national radio service. Natalie Merchant, former lead singer of the band 10,000 Maniacs became interested in Schwarz's poetry in 2019 and began adapting musical pieces to sing and interpret the poems.

Notes

References

Citations

Bibliography

 

 

 

1876 births
1947 deaths
Writers from Verona
Italian pacifists
Italian women poets
Pacifist feminists
Italian women's rights activists
Women's International League for Peace and Freedom people
20th-century Italian women writers
20th-century Italian poets
20th-century Italian Jews
Jewish women writers
Jewish poets